The BBC Young Sports Personality of the Year award is presented at the annual BBC Sports Personality of the Year award ceremony. It is awarded to the sportsperson aged 17 or under as of 1 January of that year, who has made the most outstanding contribution to sport in that year. Nominees have to be British citizens or are residents who "play a significant amount of their sport in the UK" with their solo "core achievements" being undertaken in the UK. As of 2022, nominations are put forward by a judging panel which includes representatives from the BBC, Youth Sport Trust, a Blue Peter presenter, a young Blue Peter "guest" judge and sporting talent who then decide on a ten-person shortlist. The panel later reconvenes to choose the top three, and decides on the winner by secret ballot.

The BBC Young Sports Personality of the Year award was preceded by the BBC Sports Personality of the Year Newcomer Award, in which the recipients could be aged up to 25. Decathlete Dean Macey was the inaugural winner of the Newcomer Award in 1999, and racing driver Jenson Button was the second and last winner the following year. In 2001, the award was replaced by the Young Sports Personality of the Year, and sprinter Amy Spencer was the first recipient of that award. The only person to win the award more than once is diver Tom Daley, who won the award three times, in 2007, 2009, and 2010, and was nominated to the ten-person shortlist in five successive years (2007–2011). The most recent award was presented in 2022 to artistic gymnast Jessica Gadirova.

Winners

Newcomer Award

Young Personality Award

Winners by sport 

* Including a Newcomer of the Year award

Note
  – Age refers to the age at which the sportsperson won the award.

References

General

Specific

Young Personality
Children's sport in the United Kingdom
Awards established in 1999
1999 establishments in the United Kingdom
Annual sporting events in the United Kingdom